Denio Mariano González Manzueta (born July 22, 1963) is a former professional baseball infielder. He played during five seasons at Major League Baseball (MLB) for the Pittsburgh Pirates and Cleveland Indians.

External links

1963 births
Living people
Águilas Cibaeñas players
Buffalo Bisons (minor league) players
Cleveland Indians players
Colorado Springs Sky Sox players
Dominican Republic baseball coaches
Dominican Republic expatriate baseball players in Canada
Dominican Republic expatriate baseball players in Japan
Dominican Republic expatriate baseball players in the United States
Dominican Republic national baseball team people
Gulf Coast Pirates players
Hawaii Islanders players

Major League Baseball infielders
Major League Baseball players from the Dominican Republic
Nashville Sounds players
Nippon Professional Baseball second basemen
Nippon Professional Baseball third basemen
Pawtucket Red Sox players
Pittsburgh Pirates players
Portland Beavers players
Tidewater Tides players
Vancouver Canadians players
Yomiuri Giants players
Dominican Republic expatriate baseball players in Taiwan
China Times Eagles players
Charros de Jalisco players
Dominican Republic expatriate baseball players in Mexico
Diablos Rojos del México players
Olmecas de Tabasco players
Saraperos de Saltillo players